The Branded Man is a 1928 American silent crime drama film directed by Scott Pembroke and Phil Rosen and starring Charles Delaney, June Marlowe and Gordon Griffith.

Cast
 Charles Delaney as Fred 'Deacon' Colgate
 June Marlowe as Louise
 Gordon Griffith as Bruce
 George Riley as Billy
 Andy Clyde as Jenkins
 Erin La Bissoniere as Eleanor
 Lucy Beaumont as The Mother
 Henry Roquemore as Hippo

References

Bibliography
 Robert B. Connelly. The Silents: Silent Feature Films, 1910-36, Volume 40, Issue 2. December Press, 1998.

External links
 

1928 films
1928 crime drama films
American silent feature films
American crime drama films
American black-and-white films
Films directed by Phil Rosen
Films directed by Scott Pembroke
Rayart Pictures films
1920s English-language films
1920s American films
Silent American drama films